Amazon Echo Buds are wireless earbuds made by Amazon. They are part of the Amazon Echo product family. The retail price of the earbuds is $130 USD and they have a 5-hour battery life for music playback on a single charge. The carrying case provides another 20 hours of charge.

See also 
AirPods
Pixel Buds
Microsoft Surface Earbuds
Samsung Galaxy Buds series

References

Amazon (company) hardware
Products introduced in 2019
Headphones